Steven Cerio (born September 8, 1965) is an American artist, filmmaker, musician, writer, and composer whose unmistakable style set the stage for the neo-psychedelic revival in NYC. He has created his own loving and sarcastic expressions of joy for three decades.

Cerio was raised in Liverpool, New York, then attended Syracuse University, where he received a BFA in 1987.  Arriving in New York City in 1989 he worked briefly at Jacaeber Kastor’s psychedelic art gallery Psychedelic Solution. Aside from a full schooling from Kastor on the psychedelic graphics that drew Cerio to the gallery in the first place, the gallery offered an endless stream of art greats for Cerio to rub elbows with. That list included Rick Griffin, Robert Crumb, Victor Moscoso, S. Clay Wilson and Gilbert Shelton, Last Gasp Funnies owner Ron Turner, Low Brow painter Robert Williams and poster artist Randy Tuten.

After Steven Cerio unpacked in Brooklyn in 1988 he set to illustrating, animating and for such diverse clients as Nickelodeon, Disney Enterprises, Guitar world, Guitar Player, Gary Fisher Bicycles, Conde Naste, Penguin books, Entertainment Weekly, Newsweek, Warner Brothers/Inscape, Men's Health, Musician, A&M records, L.A. Weekly,Vibe, Roger Black Design group, Details, Fantagraphics Books, Village Voice Boston Phoenix, Funny Garbage, New York, Topps Bubble Gum Cards, Art Rock, The Progressive,Feral House, MacSkinz, Family Fun, Outside, Last Gasp Eco Funnies, Total T.V., In-Line Skater, Kidstar, Circuit DVDs, Bill Graham Presents, Time.com, Radar magazine, EXIT, Chemical Imbalance and Mike Diana's infamous Boiled Angel.

Work 
Cerio's work spans all mediums from magazine and  book illustrations to posters, iPod skins, gallery walls, film, animation and posters. His art was featured in the HBO special featuring Annie Sprinkle and the "Annie Sprinkles Post Modern Pin-Ups Playing Cards" published by Gates of Heck in 1996 which features Cerio’s card backs throughout the deck. His "Happy Birthday " animations ran every morning on Nickelodeon for seven years.Some of the artist's silkscreened posters for musical acts include pieces for King Crimson, Negativland, The Residents, White Zombie, Les Claypool, Semisonic, Pete Yorn, Yonder Mountain String Band, Man-or-Astroman, Dust Devils, John Popper (Blues Traveller), Monster Magnet, Moe and jazz acts William Parker, Peter Brotzmann and Matthew Shipp. Other poster series’ include a three poster psychedelic series commissioned  by Wizard and Genius Graphics in 1996 for distribution throughout the States and Europe and a series of black light posters commissioned by Star Makers Rising in 1997. Three of his prints are featured in the set design for Comedy Central's series "Workaholics".

Steven has long been involved artistically with legendary San Francisco group The Residents -who have been credited with the invention of performance art- creating characters (graphics) for animations, DVD  graphics, posters for them. He created vinyl toys based on disguises donned by the group aptly named "The Classic Eyeball" and "Mister Skull" which were produced by legendary New York City toy manufacturer Toy Tokyo His film and animation work with the group was inducted into the permanent collection of The Museum of Modern Art in New York City. Among Cerio's work included was “Dixies Kill-a-Commie shooting gallery for their award winning  cd-rom "Bad Day at the Midway" with legendary animator Jim Ludtke. The Residents video “Birds in the Trees” was the result of his collaboration with animation great Rich Shupe and featured on the group's "Commercial DVD" DVD. "The Resident’s Disfigured Night" featured almost a hundred of Cerio’s images carefully placed by John Payson (director of the famed film “Joe’s Apartment” and projected during the group's tour supporting its release.

His book "Steven Cerio's ABC book-a drug primer" was published by Gates of Heck pubs in '99 when it won the coveted" Firecracker Book Award". Quon  Other collections of his work include Mother Shovel (1993),  PIE "A Cryptic Pilgrimage to the Nucleus of Joy (1997 by Wow Cool Pubs, Berkeley CA)https://web.archive.org/web/20140410085744/http://wowcool.com/home.php. His 56 page book "Sunbeam on the Astronaut" is scheduled for release in print and digitally by WOW COOL/Alternative Comics in April 2014.

Cerio's work has been featured in  various compilation books including "Next:The New Generation in Graphic Design" by Jesse Reyes, "Non-Traditional Design" by Mike Quon, The Art of Rock, SWAG-  Rock Poster art of the 90’s by Spencer Drate among others.

He has shown in galleries since the Eighties including FUSE gallery (NY,NY),C-POP Gallery (Detroit, MI),Lauren Wittels (NY, NY), EXIT ART (NY, NY), Brooklyn Public Library (NY, NY),CBGB's 3030 Gallery (NY, NY),La Luz de Jesus (LA, CA), Psychedelic Solution (NY, NY), Forbidden (Dallas,TX), Altered Image (Cleveland, OH), Noiseville Gallery (NY, NY), Art Directors Club (NY, NY), Rock-N-Roll Hall of Fame (Cleveland, OH) among others of smaller profile throughout the States and Europe.

As a writer he has contributed to Low Brow Art magazine Juxtapoz as well working as associate editor and art interviewer for Seconds magazine from 1995 to 1999 Where he interviewed musicians Terry Bozzio (The Missing Persons,U.K., Frank Zappa) and Bill Bruford (National Health,Yes,King Crimson,Bruford) as well as artists HR Giger, Frank Frazetta, Robert Williams, Joe Coleman, Stu Mead, Mike Diana, Stanley Mouse, Gary Panter and Storm Thorgerson of  Hipnosis who is well known for his design and photography for Pink Floyd, Syd Barrett,Genesis and The Scorpions. His writing was also featured in ".45 Dangerous minds"  published by Creation Books in 2005. It compiled Cerio’s more apocalyptic interviews with Robert Williams, Stu Mead, Mike Diana and Joe Coleman with other interviews by George Petros, Steven Blush, Adam Keane Stern, Boyd Rice and Michael Moynihan.

Films 
As an experimental filmmaker and video artist he has directed, edited and filmed videos for former Captain Beefheart and the Magic Band member Robert Arthur Williams' songs "A Bike Ride" and "Complete Bed", Wicked King Wicker song "Faith Thru Fear", Jason Martin "Harmonic Time Cycles"and Atlantic Drone "White-tail Tremble."  His mid length feature film "The Magnificent Pigtail Shadow"-directed/written/filmed by Cerio with the narration read by author of "Rat Girl" and musician Kristin Hersh was released in 2012 by Noiseville Records: the accompanying soundtrack composed by Cerio was released by Wow Cool 2013.He continues to accept commissions for video work and tour his films on both coasts. Other short films by the artist include "Fibbin Dowser" and "Suburban Still Life." Filmmaker KC Duggan directed and filmed a short film about Cerio entitled "Don't Title this-OKAY?."

"The Magnificent Pigtail Shadow" is a film by Steven Cerio featuring narration by Kristin Hersh inspired by events following the passing of his mother and sister.

Music 
As a musician Cerio performed and recorded as a drummer and percussionist in Dee Dee Ramone's Sprocket (1991–92). Recorded full-length albums and toured internationally with Drunktank (Radial/Matador). He is the percussionist in Norwegian ambient collective Sonisk Blodbad and has contributed to releases by toy pianist Michael Langlie's TWINK, The Brown Cuts Neighbors and Jason Martin (Power Animals). Cerio's current solo project Atlantic Drone has released an eponymous cd on Noiseville records and "a vivified sugarcube explains the universe" on lp by Circadia records which feature guitarist Dave Rick (Yo La Tengo, Bongwater, Phantom Tollbooth, When People were Shorter and Lived by the Water, King Missile), Michael Duane (DustDevils) and Sal Canzonieri (The Thing, Electric Frankenstein). He has also performed improvised sets and recordings with Jad Fair of Half Japanese, Ron Asheton of The Stooges and free jazz legends William Parker and Jemeel Moondoc.

Cerio has been the co-creative director of the Wow Cool record label with Marc Arsenault since 1989.

External links
 Steven Cerio's official Web Site
 Steven Cerio's Vimeo Film Channel

1965 births
Living people
American illustrators
American magazine editors
American music journalists
American rock drummers
Syracuse University College of Visual and Performing Arts alumni
20th-century American drummers
American male drummers
20th-century American male musicians
People from Liverpool, New York